The Very Best of Jimmy Somerville, Bronski Beat and The Communards is a compilation album covering Scottish pop singer Jimmy Somerville's career in Bronski Beat, The Communards and as a solo artist. It was released in 2001 and reached number 29 in the UK Albums Chart.

The album features mostly the same tracks, although in a different order, to the 1990 compilation The Singles Collection 1984/1990. Only one  track from that album, "Run from Love", isn't featured on The Very Best and is replaced with the newer track "Hurt So Good".

Although Bronski Beat had three UK top 40 hits after Somerville's departure ("Hit That Perfect Beat", "C'mon C'mon" and "Cha Cha Heels") they are not included on the compilation as it is intended as a retrospective of Somerville's career.

Track listing

Charts and certifications

Weekly charts

Certifications

References

Jimmy Somerville compilation albums
Bronski Beat albums
The Communards albums
2001 greatest hits albums
London Records albums
Albums produced by Mike Thorne
Albums produced by Stephen Hague
Albums produced by Pascal Gabriel